Tomás Nistal Fernández (born 31 August 1948) is a former road cyclist from Spain. He was a professional cyclist from 1969 to 1977. He represented his native country at the 1972 Summer Olympics in Munich, West Germany, where he finished in 54th place in the men's individual road race.

References

External links
 Spanish Olympic Committee
 

1948 births
Living people
Sportspeople from Valladolid
Cyclists from Castile and León
Cyclists at the 1972 Summer Olympics
Olympic cyclists of Spain
Spanish male cyclists